Hawkeye may refer to:

Places

United States 
 Hawkeye, Iowa, a city
 Hawkeye, Kansas, a small settlement in Kansas
 Hawkeye, Missouri, an unincorporated community
 Hawkeye Point, the highest natural point in Iowa
 Iowa, a state nicknamed the "Hawkeye State"

Arts and entertainment

Book and comic characters
 Natty Bumppo or Hawkeye, a character in James Fenimore Cooper's 1826 novel The Last of the Mohicans: A Narrative of 1757
 Hawkeye (Clint Barton), the first Marvel Comics character to use the name
 Hawkeye (Kate Bishop), the second Marvel Comics character to use the name
 One of the main characters in the Hawkeye Collins and Amy Adams, children's book series
 An agent of The Shadow
 Riza Hawkeye, a character in Fullmetal Alchemist
 Dracule "Hawkeye" Mihawk, a character in One Piece
 Hawkeye Pierce, a character in Richard Hooker's 1968 novel MASH: A Novel About Three Army Doctors

Film and television
 Hawkeye (film), a 1988 action film starring George Chung
 Hawkeye (1994 TV series), focusing on the Natty Bumppo character
 Hawkeye (2021 TV series), centered on the Marvel Comics character
 Benjamin Franklin "Hawkeye" Pierce, one of the main characters in the M* A* S* H franchise
 Hawkeye (M*A*S*H episode), an episode of the TV series

Video games
 Hawkeye (Seiken Densetsu 3), a character in Seiken Densetsu 3
 Hawkeye, a SAM vehicle in Military Madness: Nectaris
 Hawkeye, a character in Fire Emblem: The Blazing Blade

Music
 "Hawkeye", an instrumental on the 1985 Alan Parsons Project album Vulture Culture

Nickname 
 Hockey Driscoll (1876–?), Hawkeye pronounced Hockey, or Ockey, rugby union and rugby league footballer who played in the 1890s and 1900s
 Dragutin Matić (1888-1970), nicknamed Hawkeye (Serbian Cyrillic: Oko соколово), most famous Serbian scout in two Balkan Wars and the First World War.
 Giora Epstein (born 1938), retired colonel in the Israeli Air Force
 Monty "Hawkeye" Henson (born 1953), American three-time world champion saddle bronc rider
 Kenneth Lee (RAF) (1915–2008), British Second World War flying ace
 Timber Hawkeye (born 1977), author of Buddhist Boot Camp
 Tom Webster (ice hockey) (born 1948), Canadian National Hockey League and World Hockey Association retired player and coach
 Charles Whitney (born 1957), American former professional basketball player and convicted kidnapper
 Jack Womer (1917–2013), decorated American World War II veteran and a member of the Filthy Thirteen

Other uses 
 Northrop Grumman E-2 Hawkeye, a US Navy early warning aircraft
 The Hawk Eye, a newspaper in Burlington, Iowa
 Hawkeye (brand), a professional videocassette brand
 Hawkeye (spirits), a brand of liquor sold by Luxco
 Hawkeye Transfer Company Warehouse, listed on the National Register of Historic Places in Polk County, Iowa
 Red Delicious or Hawkeye apple, a type of apple
 Iowa Hawkeyes, sports teams of the University of Iowa
 Hawkeye Open, a golf tournament in Iowa City, Iowa, from 1991 to 1993
 Hawkeye Community College, a community college, with its main campus located just outside Waterloo, Iowa
 Ruger Hawkeye, a single-shot pistol
 Ruger M77, a bolt-action rifle

See also 
 Hawk-Eye, a tracking system used in cricket, Gaelic football, hurling, tennis and other sports
 Hawkeye State, a nickname for the state of Iowa
 The Hawkeye Initiative, a Tumblr page that places the fictional comic character Hawkeye in poses held by female characters
 Hawk's Eye (Sailor Moon), a member of the Amazon Trio in the Sailor Moon series
 Hawk's eye, a gemstone which is a variant of Tiger's Eye